In Ireland at the end of the sixteenth and beginning of the seventeenth century, the fortified house, along with the stronghouse, developed as a replacement for the tower house. 'Fortified Houses' were often rectangular, or sometimes U or L-shaped, three-storey structures with high gables and chimney stacks and large windows with hood mouldings. Some examples have square towers at the corners. The interiors were relatively spacious with wooden partitions and numerous fireplaces. In a number of cases 'Fortified Houses' were built onto pre-existing tower houses. 'Fortified Houses' were protected by gun fire from the angle towers and bartizans, and were also provided with bawn walls with gunloops, towers and protected gateways. 'Fortified Houses' were built throughout Ireland by large landowners from a variety of backgrounds, such as the Old English Earl of Clanricarde who built Portumna Castle in County Galway; Gaelic lords such as MacDonogh MacCarthy, Lord of Duhallow, who built Kanturk Castle in County Cork; and Cromwellian soldiers such as Sir Charles Coote, who built Rush Hall in County Offaly.

Examples
Athlumney Castle, Navan
Burncourt Castle, County Tipperary
Coolhull Castle, County Wexford
Dromaneen Castle, County Cork
The Mint, Carlingford, County Louth
Portumna Castle, County Galway
Robertstown Castle, County Meath
Saint David's Castle, Naas
Terryglass Castle, County Tipperary

See also
Tower house
Manor house

References

Joe Nunan (2006) "The Fortified Houses of County Cork: Origin, fabric, form, function and social space", The Proceedings of the 2006 Association of Young Irish Archaeologists conference, pp. 65–75.

External links
The Fortified House: A Review 

Architecture in the Republic of Ireland
16th-century architecture
Fortifications in Ireland
Fortified houses

de:Festes Haus
fr:Maison forte